The Vermont Cynic is the award-winning, editorially-independent student newspaper of the University of Vermont (UVM). The Cynic has been published since 1883 (as The University Cynic). Up until 1985, The Cynic was published using movable type. The Cynic has been published online since 2001. In November 2020 it paused publication of print issues, citing low readership due to COVID-19, and resumed traditional print publication beginning in December 2021. It distributes print copies every week to various locations on campus. 

The Vermont Cynic won the Associated Collegiate Press' Newspaper Pacemaker award in October 2011, widely considered the Pulitzer Prize of student journalism. In October 2012, The Vermont Cynic won the Associated Collegiate Press' Online Pacemaker award. The Cynic won Diversity Story of the Year in 2016 from the ACP for its reporting on the history of "Kake Walk," a Minstrel show tradition at UVM's Winter Carnival that continued until 1969. The paper was also a finalist for another Pacemaker award in 2017. In 2018, the Cynic took second place in the environmental portrait category for Photo of the Year.

Editorial board
For Spring 2022:
 Editor-in-Chief: Ella Ruehsen 
 Managing Editor: Eric Scharf 
 Layout/Social Media: Ellie Scott
 Operations Manager: Allison McDonald
 Copy Chief: Catie Segaloff 
 Culture: Paige Fisher
 Features: Elizabeth Roote
 Illustrations: Izzy Pipa
 Opinion: Grace Visco
 News: Halsey McLaen
 Sports: Matthew Rosenberg
 Podcasts: Nicole Hardy
 Photo: Sophia Balunek

Notable alumni
 Eric Lipton, a Pulitzer Prize-winning reporter at The New York Times

References

External links
 The Vermont Cynic

University of Vermont
Student newspapers published in Vermont
Publications established in 1883
1883 establishments in Vermont
Mass media in Burlington, Vermont